Tom White (born 26 January 1976 in Bristol) is an English footballer, he plays as a defender.

Tom started his career as a trainee at Bristol Rovers, later moving on loan to Hereford United, before signing permanently for Yeovil Town. While at Yeovil he won the FA Trophy in 2002, and won promotion from the Football Conference in 2003 before being loaned to Woking. The end of his Yeovil career was ruined by knee injuries and was released at the end of the 2002–03 season.

In November 2001, Tom and his girlfriend Louis lost their daughter Olivia to a brain tumour after a yearlong battle.

References

External links

1976 births
Footballers from Bristol
Living people
English footballers
Association football defenders
Bristol Rovers F.C. players
Hereford United F.C. players
Yeovil Town F.C. players
Woking F.C. players
English Football League players
National League (English football) players